Katherine Fahy, Lady Pryce is a stage and film actress from Dublin. She studied drama at Bristol Old Vic Theatre School, and then joined its Young Vic Theatre Company. Later on she joined the Everyman Theatre Liverpool Company, where she met actor Jonathan Pryce. She made her theatre directorial debut in January 2010 with Wet Weather Cover, a play written by Oliver Cotton.

In 2017, she was in 'A Lie of the Mind' at Southwark Playhouse with Gethin Anthony and Robert Lonsdale.

She and Pryce, whom she married in 2015, have three children: Patrick (born 1983), Gabriel (born 1986), and Phoebe (born 1990).

Filmography

References

External links

English film actresses
English stage actresses
Living people
Year of birth missing (living people)
Actresses from Birmingham, West Midlands
20th-century English actresses
21st-century English actresses
English television actresses
Alumni of Bristol Old Vic Theatre School
Wives of knights